MNB is an onscreen brand of what is officially known in Mongolian as Монголын Үндэсний Олон Нийтийн Телевиз 1 (shortened as МҮОНТ-1), is a television channel owned by the Mongolian National Broadcaster (MNB), the official, state-funded broadcaster in Mongolia. On average, the channel broadcasts for 17 hours a day, from 07:00 to midnight.

History
On September 27, 1967, the Mongolian National Television started broadcasts, and with it started Mongolian TV Broadcasting. Initially all programmes were broadcast live but in December 1971 the Mongolian TV studios opened and another important step towards improving the quality of the images and enabling the pre-recording of documentaries and short films was taken. This in turn enabled the broadcast schedule to become much more varied and entertaining. Since the 1980s Mongolian National Broadcaster began working with a new generation of equipment made in Japan, France and Russia and this, along with a new TV centre being put into commission, made the transition to colour possible.

Until the mid-1980s, programs were only watched by a small percentage of the population but with the help of radio relay lines reception was extended. In 1991 it began broadcasting via the Asiasat satellite and this allowed its programs to be received in even the remotest parts of Mongolia. Today some 70% of the country's population watch the national TV channel.

See also
Media of Mongolia
Communications in Mongolia

References

External links
Official Site 

Television in Mongolia
Television channels and stations established in 1967